Zona Franca is a Barcelona Metro station located in the Zona Franca neighbourhood of the Barcelona municipality, served by line L10. Until the opening of the Zona Franca-ZAL | Riu Vell section on 7 November 2021, the station was the southern terminus of the Line 10 Sud.

References

Barcelona Metro line 10 stations
Railway stations in Spain opened in 2020
2020 establishments in Catalonia